St John's Cathedral (in full, The Cathedral Church of St John the Evangelist) is the Anglican cathedral in Mthatha (King Sabata Dalindyebo Local Municipality), South Africa.  It is the seat of the Bishop of the Anglican Diocese of Mthatha.

The foundation stone was laid by Bishop Joseph Watkin Williams on 16 December 1901 in memory of his predecessor Bishop Bransby Lewis Key.

History
In December 1906, the building committee prepared a report to be presented to the Diocesan Synod on the building of the Cathedral.

Notes

Anglican cathedrals in South Africa
Churches in the Eastern Cape
Herbert Baker buildings and structures
Historic sites in South Africa
1901 establishments in the Cape Colony
King Sabata Dalindyebo Local Municipality